Rhapsody may refer to:

 A work of epic poetry, or part of one, that is suitable for recitation at one time
 Rhapsode, a classical Greek professional performer of epic poetry

Computer software 
 Rhapsody (online music service), an online music store subscription service
 Rhapsody (operating system), the code name for the Apple Macintosh operating system that eventually evolved into Mac OS X
 Rhapsody: A Musical Adventure, a 1998 video game developed by Nippon Ichi Software
 Rational Rhapsody, a UML and SysML software tool for developing embedded and real-time systems

Music 
 Rhapsody (music), an episodic instrumental composition of indefinite form

 Rhapsody (Ashton), a ballet by Frederick Ashton based on a Rachmaninoff rhapsody
 Rhapsody (John Ireland), a 1915 piano composition by John Ireland
 Rhapsody (operetta), an operetta by Fritz Kreisler (music) and John La Touche (lyrics) 
 Rhapsody (Osborne), a composition by Willson Osborne
 Rhapsodies, Op. 79 (Brahms), a solo piano piece
 Rhapsody (online music service), a digital music streaming and download service

Performers
 Rhapsody (girl group), an Australian female duo
 Rhapsody of Fire (formerly Rhapsody), an Italian metal band
 Luca Turilli's Rhapsody, a project split off from Rhapsody of Fire
 Turilli / Lione Rhapsody
 Rapsody (Marlanna Evans), American rapper

Albums
 Rhapsody (Ahmad Jamal album), 1966
 Rhapsody (Ben E. King album), 1976
 Rhapsody (Mr. Mike album), 1999
 Rhapsodies (album), by Rick Wakeman, 1979
 Rapsodies, by Vangelis and Irene Papas, 1986
 Rhapsody, by Bonnie Bianco, 1987

Other culture 
 Rhapsody (film), a 1954 film based on the novel Maurice Guest and directed by Charles Vidor
 Rhapsody (comics), a Marvel Comics character
 Rhapsody: Child of Blood (1999), the first novel in Elizabeth Haydon's fantasy series, the Symphony of Ages
 Rhapsody (The Symphony of Ages), the main character
 Rhapsody: A Musical Adventure, a 1998 console role-playing game for the PlayStation and Nintendo DS video game systems
 Rhapsody (TV series), a Canadian music television series
  Rhapsody (magazine), one of United Airlines' inflight magazines.
 Rhapsody, one of the pilots of the Angel Interceptors in Captain Scarlet
 Rhapsodiae, a body of work ascribed to the legendary musician and prophet Orpheus

Other uses
 MS Rhapsody of the Seas, a Vision Class cruise ship for Royal Caribbean International
 MS Golden Iris, a cruise ship formerly owned by MSC Cruises as MS Rhapsody
 Rapsodie, experimental nuclear reactor in France
 RAPSODEE, a laboratory at one of France's Grand Ecoles, École des mines d'Albi-Carmaux
 Rhapsody, an annual student fest of Medical College Kolkata

See also
 Rapsodia (disambiguation)